Koumbi Saleh, sometimes Kumbi Saleh is the site of a ruined medieval town in south east Mauritania that may have been the capital of the Ghana Empire.

From the ninth century, Arab authors mention the Ghana Empire in connection with the trans-Saharan gold trade. The discovery in 1913 of a 17th-century African chronicle that gave the name of the capital as Koumbi led French archaeologists to the ruins at Koumbi Saleh. Excavations at the site have revealed the ruins of a large Muslim town with houses built of stone and a congregational mosque but no inscription to unambiguously identify the site as that of capital of Ghana. Ruins of the king's town described by al-Bakri have not been found. Radiocarbon dating suggests that the site was occupied between the late 9th and 14th centuries.

Arabic sources and the capital of the Ghana Empire
The earliest author to mention Ghana is the Persian astronomer Ibrahim al-Fazari who, writing at the end of the eighth century, refers to "the territory of Ghana, the land of gold". The Ghana Empire lay in the Sahel region to the north of the West African gold fields and was able to profit from controlling the trans-Saharan gold trade. The early history of Ghana is unknown but there is evidence that North Africa had begun importing gold from West Africa before the Arab conquest in the middle of the seventh century.

In the medieval Arabic sources the word "Ghana" can refer to a royal title, the name of a capital city or a kingdom. The earliest reference to Ghana as a town is by al-Khuwarizmi who died in around 846 AD. Two centuries later a detailed description of the town is provided by al-Bakri in his Book of Routes and Realms which he completed in around 1068. Al-Bakri never visited the region but obtained his information from earlier writers and from informants that he met in his native Spain:

The city of Ghāna consists of two towns situated on a plain. One of these towns, which is inhabited by Muslims, is large and possesses twelve mosques, in one of which they assemble for Friday prayer. ... In the environs are wells with sweet water, from which they drink and with which they grow vegetables. The king's town is  distant from this one and bears the name of Al-Ghāba. Between these two towns are continuous habitations. The houses of the inhabitants are of stone and acacia wood. The king has a palace and a number of domed dwellings all surrounded with an enclosure like a city wall. In the king's town, and not far from his courts of justice, is a mosque where Muslims who arrive in his court pray. Around the king's town are domed buildings and groves and thickets where the sorcerers of these people, men in charge of the religious cult, live.

The descriptions provided by the early Arab authors lack sufficient detail to pinpoint the exact location of the town. In fact, the sources appear contradictory with al-Idrisi placing the town on both sides of the Niger River. This has led to the suggestion that at some point the capital may have been moved south to the Niger River. The much later 17th-century African chronicle, the Tarikh al-fattash, states that the Malian Empire was preceded by the Kayamagna dynasty which had a capital at a town called Koumbi. The chronicle does not use the word Ghana. The other important 17th-century chronicle, the Tarikh al-Sudan mentions that the Malian Empire came after the dynasty of Qayamagha which had its capital at the city of Ghana. It is assumed that the "Kayamagna" or "Qayamagha" dynasty ruled the empire of Ghana mentioned in the early Arabic sources.

In the French translation of the Tarikh al-fattash published in 1913, Octave Houdas and Maurice Delafosse include a footnote in which they comment that local tradition also suggested that the first capital of Kayamagna was at Koumbi and that the town was in the Ouagadougou region, northeast of Goumbou on the road leading from Goumbou to Néma and Oualata.

The Soninke Wangara exchanged salt for Bambuk gold, though they kept the source of the gold a secret from Muslim traders, with whom they exchanged the gold for clothing and other Maghrib goods.  The king received one dinar of gold for each load of Saharn salt imported from the north, and two for each load exported to the south, keeping each gold nugget for himself.  Muslim secretaries were employed to keep records of the taxable trade.  Yet, in the 11th and 12th centuries, the Bure goldfields were developed, so that by the end of the 12th century, Ghana no longer dominated the gold trade.  The Soninke farmers and traders then settled further south and west in the early 13th century.

Archaeological site

The extensive ruins at Koumbi Saleh were first reported by Albert Bonnel de Mézières in 1914. The site lies in the Sahel region of southern Mauritania, 30 km north of the Malian border, 57 km south-southeast of Timbédra and 98 km northwest of the town of Nara in Mali. The vegetation is low grass with thorny scrub and the occasional acacia tree. In the wet season (July–September) the limited rain fills a number of depressions, but for the rest of the year there is no rain and no surface water.

Beginning with Bonnel de Mézières in 1914, the site has been excavated by successive teams of French archaeologists. Paul Thomassey and Raymond Mauny excavated between 1949 and 1951, Serge Robert during 1975-76 and Sophie Berthier during 1980–81.

The main section of the town lay on a small hill that nowadays rises to about 15 m above the surrounding plain. The hill would have originally been lower as part of the present height is a result of the accumulated ruins. The houses were constructed from local stone (schist) using banco rather than mortar. From the quantity of debris it is likely that some of the buildings had more than one storey. The rooms were quite narrow, probably due to the absence of large trees to provide long rafters to support the ceilings. The houses were densely packed together and separated by narrow streets. In contrast a wide avenue, up to 12 m in width, ran in an east–west direction across the town. At the western end lay an open site that was probably used as a marketplace. The main mosque was centrally placed on the avenue. It measured approximately 46 m east to west and 23 m north to south. The western end was probably open to the sky. The mihrab faced due east. The upper section of the town covered an area of 700 m by 700 m. To the southwest lay a lower area (500 m by 700 m) that would have been occupied by less permanent structures and the occasional stone building. There were two large cemeteries outside the town suggesting that the site was occupied over an extended period. Radiocarbon dating of charcoal fragments from a house near the mosque have given dates that range between the late 9th and the 14th centuries. The French archaeologist Raymond Mauny estimated that the town would have accommodated between 15,000 and 20,000 inhabitants. Mauny himself acknowledged that this is an enormous population for a town in the Sahara with a very limited supply of water ("Chiffre énorme pour une ville saharienne").
 
The archaeological evidence suggests that Koumbi Saleh was a Muslim town with a strong Maghreb connection.  No inscription has been found to unambiguously link the ruins with the Muslim capital of Ghana described by al-Bakri. Moreover, the ruins of the king's town of Al-Ghaba have not been found. This has led some historian to doubt the identification of Koumbi Saleh as the capital of Ghana.

World Heritage Status 
The archaeological site was added to the UNESCO World Heritage Tentative List on June 14, 2001 in the Cultural category.

Notes

References
.
.
.
.
. Volume 1 is the Arabic text, Volume 2 is a translation into French. Reprinted by  Maisonneuve in 1964 and 1981. The French text is also available from Aluka but requires a subscription.
 .
.
. Reprinted by Holmes & Meier in 1980.
. First published in 1981.
.
.
. Includes a detailed plan of the archaeological site as Figure 95 on page 480.
.
.

Further reading
.
.
.
.
.
.
.
.

External links
.

Capitals of former nations
Archaeological sites in Mauritania
Ghana Empire
History of Mauritania
Former populated places in Mauritania
Archaeological sites of Western Africa